Menegon is an Italian surname. Notable people with the surname include:

Andrea Menegon (born 1988), Italian footballer
Daniela Menegon (born 1977), Swazi swimmer
Lyndon Menegon (born 1948), Australian cricketer

Italian-language surnames